St. Joseph's College (Autonomous), Jakhama, is a college established and managed by the Diocese of Kohima, Nagaland. It is the first college established by the Catholic Church in Nagaland and is located in the southern part of the Kohima Metropolitan Area at Jakhama.

As of 2019, there are 3840 students (3676 U.G and 164 P.G) making it the largest college in Nagaland. According to Education World's ‘India Autonomous Colleges Rankings 2020–2021’, the college was ranked 1st among the private autonomous colleges in North East India and 56th in India.

Campus
The college's main campus covers an area of approximately 200 Hectares (2 sq km) situated on the NH-2 at Jakhama in the Southern Angami region of Kohima District which is located about 18 kilometers from Kohima city.

Main Building

Constructed between 2004 and 2010, it is also known as the 'Silver Jubilee Memorial Building' or the 'Arts Block' for it houses mainly the Arts classrooms. The Main Building also houses the offices of the Principal, Vice Principal (Academic affairs), Vice Principal (Students' affairs), Administrator and the Students' Council along with the College library, Conference Hall and other offices of the various departments of the college.

Pope Francis Science Block

Although called the Science Block, it also houses the classrooms of BBA and Commerce students.

Due to the increasing number of students each year, the new building was constructed between 2013 and 2015 to accommodate the Science students but later included the classrooms of BBA and Commerce. It also houses the office of the 'Dean of Science' and the college laboratory.

Bishop Abraham Memorial Indoor Stadium

The Bishop Abraham Memorial Indoor Stadium is mainly used for formal programmes and events besides various sports activities like Basketball, Badminton, Volleyball, etc. It can accommodate over 4000 people during events of the college.

Hostels
There are four hostels located inside the college's main campus which can accommodate over 1500 students.
SJC Men's Hostel
Adoration Women's Hostel
Ave Maria Women's Hostel
CMC Women's Hostel

PG Block
The Post Graduate Block is currently under construction.

History
The College was inaugurated on 19 March 1985 at the Loyola School Campus, Jakhama, under the administration of the society of Jesus, with Pre-University Courses in Arts (including a Vocational Course) and Commerce. It was affiliated to the North Eastern Hill University, Shillong, in the same year. The College is now located in a spacious campus west of Jakhama. Degree Courses in Arts (Bachelor of Arts) and in Commerce (Bachelor of Commerce) were started in 1988. The College was affiliated to the Nagaland University with the establishment of a university within the State of Nagaland in July 1994.

In 2018, the college was conferred to Autonomous status by the University Grants Commission (UGC).

Principals

Academics
Department of BBA
Department of Botany
Department of Chemistry
Department of Commerce
Department of Economics
Department of Education
Department of English
Established in 1994, the Department of English, as of 2019 has an enrollment of about 400 students.
Department of History
The Department of History was established in the year 1994. As of 2019, it is the second largest department in the college with a total enrollment of about 600 students.
Department of Political Science
The Department of Political Science or popularly referred to as 'Polasso or The Polassos' was established in the year 1994. As of 2019, it is the largest department in the college with a total enrollment of about 700 students.
Department of Sociology
The Department of Sociology was established in the year 1994. As of 2019, it has an enrollment of about 300 students.
Department of Zoology

Student life

Extra curricular activities
 Spring Fest
Spring Fest is an annual social and cultural festival held during the month of March. The two-day festival attracts students between 3500–4000 each year.

The festival is organised by the Innovators Club in collaboration with the SJCJ Students' Council.

 College Week
The College Week is a week long Sports and Socio-Cultural event held annually during the last week of November.

 Eureka Science Fest
Held annually during the month of July. The Eureka Science Fest is an Inter-College Science festival where participants from other colleges takes part. The event is organised by the Department of Science.

 Convergence
Convergence is an annual Inter-College Social event organized annually during the month of August by the Department of BBA.

Awards
Governor's Gold Medal
The Governor's Gold Medal was instituted by his Excellency, the late Dr. M. M. Thomas, the Governor of Nagaland in the year 1990. It was conferred to the Best Graduate of the year. It was conferred for the first time at first Graduation Day on 22 August 1990.

Chikrophuyo Memorial Award
The Chikrophuyo Memorial Award was instituted in the year 1994 in honour of late Chikrophuyo, a B.A Honours student in Political Science. It was instituted by his family and is conferred to the best B.A Student of the Year who secures the highest percentage of marks in the University Examinations giving due regard to attendance and character.

Avica Achümi Memorial Award
Avica Achümi Memorial Award was instituted in 1999 in honour of late Avica Achümi who expired in July 1998. Sponsored by G. Vinton Achümi, the father of late Avica Achümi. It is awarded to the best B.Com student of the year who secures the highest percentage of marks in the University Examinations giving due regards to attendance and character.

Best BBA Student Award
The Best BBA Student Award was instituted in the year 2018 by the college. It is awarded to the best BBA student of the Year and carries a memento, a citation and a personal gift.

Best Science Student Award
The Best Science Student Award was instituted in the year 2015 by the college. It is awarded to the best Science student of the year and it carries a memento, a citation and a personal gift.

APJ Abdul Kalam Award
A. P. J. Abdul Kalam Award was instituted by Governor Padmanabha Acharya, the then Governor of Nagaland during the Graduation Day in 2015. It is award for best Academic Performance. It carries a memento, a medal, a personal gift and a citation.

Dr. Talimeren Ao Award
Dr. Talimeren Ao Award was instituted by the then Governor of Nagaland, Padmanabha Acharya, during the Graduation Day in 2015. It is awarded for the Best Sports Person. It carries a memento, a personal gift and a citation.

Mahatma Gandhi Award
Mahatma Gandhi Award was instituted by the then Governor of Nagaland, Padmanabha Acharya during the Graduation Day in 2015. It is awarded for best Overall Performance. It carries a memento, a medal, a personal gift and a citation.

Alumni Association Award
The Alumni Association Award was instituted in the year 2004, by the Alumni Association of the college. It is awarded to the best General Student of the year and it carries a cash prize, a citation and a personal gift.

Students' council
The St. Joseph's College, Jakhama Students' Council (SJCJSC) is the apex students' body of the college. The council is officially recognised by the college administration as the sole umbrella organisation of all student in the college.

Presidents

College anthem
Josephites ariseLet your light shine 
Glow in the radiance of knowledge and truthUnited in the spirit of love 
To thousands outside the wall we shall proclaim United we stand

Arise and shineMessengers of peace 
Always and forever we shall remain A family knitted in one 
To give all mankind a hope for tomorrow Arise and shine

Library
The library has a total collection of 19,165 including text book related curriculum material, inspiration, information and reference books like Encyclopedia, Yearbook, Dictionaries, supplement to Encyclopedia, Geographical sources, Directories, Handbook and Manual, etc.

Transportation
The college provides 24 buses pressed into regular bus service to commute students and staffs.

In addition there are private buses and taxis travelling to and from other parts of Kohima district.

Notable alumni and faculty members
St. Joseph's alumni are called ‘Josephites’. The College has produced a sizeable number of notable personalities in varied fields, both academic and otherwise. An individual may be associated with two or more colleges, as an undergraduate, postgraduate and/or member of staff.

List of notable Josephite

Viseyie Koso, Sportsperson
Abraham Lotha, Former Principal and Anthropologist
N. Bongkhao Konyak, Politician

Notes

References

External links

Official sites
 St. Joseph's College, Jakhama Official Website
 @sjcjakhama on Instagram

Christian universities and colleges in India
Universities and colleges in Nagaland
Colleges affiliated to Nagaland University
Kohima district
Educational institutions established in 1985
1985 establishments in Nagaland